Getting into Death and Other Stories is a collection of science fiction stories by Thomas M. Disch.  It was first published by Knopf in 1976.  Many of the stories originally appeared in the magazines New Worlds, Antæus, The Paris Review, Transatlantic Review and Fantastic.

Contents

 "Apollo"
 "The Asian Shore"
 "The Birds"
 "The Colors"
 "Death and the Single Girl"
 "Displaying the Flag"
 "Feathers from the Wings of an Angel"
 "Getting Into Death"
 "The Joycelin Shrager Story"
 "Let Us Quickly Hasten to the Gate of Ivory"
 "The Master of the Milford Altarpiece"
 "The Persistence of Desire"
 "The Planet Arcadia"
 "Quincunx"
 "Slaves"
 "[X] Yes"

Sources

1976 short story collections
Short story collections by Thomas M. Disch